

The Burgess Type O Gunbus was an American pusher biplane fighter designed and built by the Burgess Company at Marblehead, Massachusetts.

A total of 36 Type Os (also known as the Burgess Gunbus), powered by a single 140 hp (104 kW) Sturtevant engine, was ordered by the British Admiralty in 1915 for use by the Royal Naval Air Service (RNAS). Built in the United States they were shipped to Hendon Aerodrome for erection. The first aircraft flew from Hendon on 26 August 1915 and some of first aircraft were used for training at Hendon and Eastchurch but most went into storage, the last six were not even unpacked. All were removed from the inventory in 1916.

Operators

Royal Naval Air Service

See also

References

Notes

Bibliography

 Ray Sturtivant and Gordon Page Royal Navy Aircraft Serials and Units 1911-1919 Air-Britain, 1992. .
 Thetford, Owen. British Naval Aircraft since 1912. London:Putnam, Fourth edition, 1978. .

External links
 Photo of Burgess Gunbus in flight

Single-engined pusher aircraft
1910s United States fighter aircraft
Aircraft first flown in 1915